Bazoft-e Pain Rural District is in Bazoft District of Kuhrang County, Chaharmahal and Bakhtiari province, Iran. There were 8,880 inhabitants in 1,804 households in the National Census of 2011. At the most recent census of 2016, the population of the rural district was 9,079 in 2,141 households. The largest of its 45 villages was Cham Qaleh, with 1,469 people.

References 

Kuhrang County

Rural Districts of Chaharmahal and Bakhtiari Province

Populated places in Chaharmahal and Bakhtiari Province

Populated places in Kuhrang County

fa:دهستان بازفت پايين